UNIT: Time Heals is a Big Finish Productions audio drama based on the long-running British science fiction television series Doctor Who. It stars Nicholas Courtney reprising his role as Brigadier Lethbridge-Stewart, the former commander of UNIT (United Nations Intelligence Taskforce). "Time Heals", released in December 2004, is the first in a four-part mini-series.

Plot 
The UK branch of UNIT has handed over its duties to the government's own military investigative organisation, ICIS. When UNIT's command officer goes missing and a dangerous and secret cargo gets hijacked, Colonel Emily Chaudry, the division's publicity officer finds herself in charge.

Cast
The Brigadier - Nicholas Courtney
Colonel Emily Chaudhry - Siri O'Neal
Colonel Robert Dalton - Nicholas Deal
Lieutenant Dodds - Matthew Brenher
Kelly - Stephen Carlile
Lieutenant Hoffman - Robert Curbishley
Francis Currie - Michael Hobbs
Meade - Alfred Hoffman

External links
Big Finish Productions - UNIT: Time Heals

Time Heals
2004 audio plays